Max Daniel Sheaf (born 10 March 2000) is an English footballer who plays as a midfielder for Redditch United.

Career
Born in Gravesend, he made his league debut in the final match of the 2018–19 season when he came on in the 54th-minute as a substitute for Fraizer Campbell against Bristol City.

On 29 July 2019, Sheaf joined Cheltenham Town on loan until January 2020. He made his debut for the Robins in the first match of the 2019–20 season playing 75 mins in a 1–0 loss to Leyton Orient. He scored his first professional in an EFL Trophy tie against Newport County on 12 November 2019.

Sheaf's loan at Cheltenham was extended until the end of the season on 8 January 2020.

On 18 January 2021, Sheaf joined National League side Torquay United on loan for the remainder of the 2020–21 season.

Sheaf was released by Hull City at the end of the 2020–21 season.

On 27 August 2021, Sheaf signed a one-year contract with Gloucester City. He was released at the end of the 2021-22 season.

On 18 February 2022, Sheaf was sent on a month-long loan spell to Hungerford Town. 

On 5 August 2022, Redditch United announced the signing of Sheaf on a free transfer following his release from Gloucester City.

Personal life
Sheaf's older brother Ben is also a footballer.
He went to The Anthony Roper Primary School, then moved on to Wilmington Grammar School for Boys in 2011.

Career statistics

References

2000 births
Living people
Footballers from Kent
Sportspeople from Gravesend, Kent
English footballers
Association football midfielders
Hull City A.F.C. players
Gloucester City A.F.C. players
Cheltenham Town F.C. players
Torquay United F.C. players
Hungerford Town F.C. players
Redditch United F.C. players
English Football League players